Alchemilla xanthochlora is a species of plants belonging to the family Rosaceae.

It is native to Europe and Northern America.

References

xanthochlora